WFSI (860 AM), formerly WBGR, is a radio station broadcasting a Religious format. Licensed to Baltimore, Maryland, United States, the station is currently owned by Family Radio. WFSI-AM airs several Christian ministry broadcasts from noted teachers such as RC Sproul, Alistair Begg, Ken Ham, John F. MacArthur, Adriel Sanchez, Dennis Rainey, John Piper, & others as well as traditional and modern hymns & songs by Keith & Kristyn Getty, The Master's Chorale, Fernando Ortega, Chris Rice, Shane & Shane, Sovereign Grace Music, Sara Groves, & multiple other Christian and Gospel music artists.

Because it shares the same frequency as "clear channel" station CJBC in Toronto, WFSI severely reduces its power during nighttime hours.

On December 1, 2011, the WBGR call letters changed to WFSI, formerly the call letters of 107.9 FM, now WLZL, "El Zol;" El Zol moved from 99.1 FM, now WDCH-FM.

See also 
WLZL 
WDCH-FM

References

External links

Christianity in Baltimore
FSI
Family Radio stations
Radio stations established in 1955
1955 establishments in Maryland
FSI